Joël Dupuch is a French oyster farmer, restaurateur, author and actor.

Biography
He is a sixth-generation oyster farmer from the Arcachon Bay. He started working in 1973. He has been called "the most famous oyster farmer" in France. He owns Joël D., a restaurant in Bordeaux which specializes in salmon, foie gras and oysters.

Since 2006, he has acted in three feature films. In 2012, he published a book.

Filmography
Tell No One (dir. Guillaume Canet, 2006).
Little White Lies (dir. Guillaume Canet, 2010).
Jappeloup (dir. Christian Duguay, 2013).

Bibliography
Sur la vague du bonheur (Paris: Editions Michel Lafon, 2012)

References

Living people
Year of birth missing (living people)
French restaurateurs
21st-century French male actors
Oysters